This is a list of notable events in music that took place in the year 1686.

Events

Classical music
Michel Richard Delalande – Ecce nunc benedicte, S.8
Henry Du Mont – Benedic anima mea
Johann Caspar Kerll 
Modulatio organica
Toccata cromatica con durezze e ligature
Marin Mariais – Pièces de viole, Livre 1
Johann Christoph Pezel – Opus musicum sonatarum praestantissimarum (The "Alphabet Sonatas")
Henry Purcell
Ye Tuneful Muses
(attrib.) – "Lillibullero"
Vasily Titov – Psaltïr' rifmovannaya (Псалтырь рифмованная or Псалтырь римфотворная), vocal polyphonic setting of the Russian psalter
Giuseppe Torelli – 10 Sonate a 3, with basso continuo, Op. 1
Robert de Visée – Livre de pièces pour la guitare

Opera
Jean-Baptiste Lully 
Acis et Galatée, LWV 73
Armide, LWV 71
Giacomo Antonio Perti– L'incoronazione di Dario
Alessandro Scarlatti – Olimpia vendicata

Births
July 31 (or August 1) – Benedetto Marcello, composer (died 1739)
August 17 – Nicola Porpora, composer (died 1768)
September – Charles Young, organist and composer (died 1758)
October 31 – Senesino, castrato singer (died 1758)
December 15 – Jean-Joseph Fiocco, composer (died 1746)
December 25 – Giovanni Battista Somis, violinist and composer (died 1763)

Deaths
c. November – John Playford, music publisher (born 1623)
probable – Augustin Pfleger, composer (born 1635)

References

 
17th century in music
Music by year